Kim Hyun-chul is a Korean name consisting of the family name Kim and the given name Hyun-chul, and may also refer to:

 Kim Hyun-chul (politician) (1901-1989), South Korean politician
 Kim Hyun-chul (academic) (1959-), South Korean politician, academic, son of president Kim Young-sam
 Kim Hyun-chul (singer) (born 1969), South Korean singer
 Kim Hyun-chul (comedian) (born 1970), South Korean comedian